The 2021 Tokyo Marathon was the fifteenth edition of the annual marathon race in Tokyo. The competition was held on Sunday 6 March 2022, having been postponed twice due to the COVID-19 pandemic. The elite events were won by Kenyans Eliud Kipchoge and Brigid Kosgei respectively, whilst the wheelchair races were won by Swiss athlete Marcel Hug and Japanese competitor Tsubasa Kina. Around 20,000 people competed in the mass participation event.

Background
In October 2020, the 2021 Tokyo Marathon was postponed from its usual date in March to October, due to the COVID-19 pandemic. In September 2021, the event was postponed again, with the new date being 6 March 2022. As a consequence of this postponement, the 2022 Tokyo Marathon was cancelled, and the Tokyo Marathon was the only one of the World Marathon Majors that did not happen in 2021.

Due to the COVID-19 pandemic, international competitors were not permitted in the mass participation event. All competitors were required to either be double-vaccinated or have a negative result from a PCR test. Slight alterations were made to the course from previous years due to building works near Iidabashi and on National Route 15.

Competitors

The elite men's race featured Eliud Kipchoge, who won the marathon event at the delayed 2020 Summer Olympics. It was his first competitive race since the Olympics. Other competitors included 2020 winner Legese Birhanu, Mosinet Geremew, Amos Kipruto and Tamirat Tola, all of whom had a personal best time under 2:04, and Shura Kitata, who won the 2020 London Marathon. Japanese athlete and national record holder  who came fourth at the 2021 Chicago Marathon, also raced.

The favourite for the elite women's race was Brigid Kosgei, who came second in the marathon event at the delayed 2020 Summer Olympics. Other competitors with a personal best under 2:20 were Angela Tanui, Ashete Bekere and Hiwot Gebrekidan. American Sara Hall raced, as did Japanese athlete Mao Ichiyama.

Due to the COVID-19 pandemic, there were fewer international athletes in the wheelchair events; over 80% of competitors were Japanese. The men's wheelchair competition featured Swiss athlete Marcel Hug, who won the marathon T54 race at the delayed 2020 Summer Paralympics. Other competitors included Briton Johnboy Smith and Tomoki Suzuki, who was the only Japanese competitor in the Paralympic T54 marathon event. The women's wheelchair race featured two competitors: 2020 winner Tsubasa Kina and Wakako Tsuchida.

Race summary

The elite men's event was won by Kenyan Eliud Kipchoge in a time of 2:02:40, which was the fourth fastest time in history and a competition record. At the halfway point, the leading pack contained five runners: Kipchoge, Amos Kipruto, Tamirat Tola, Mosinet Geremew and Jonathan Korir; Geremew withdrew from the race after . After , only Kipchoge, Kipruto and Tola were in the leading pack, and Kipchoge broke away from fellow countryman Amos Kipruto after  of the race. Kipruto finished second, with Ethiopian Tamirat Tola third. Kengo Suzuki finished fourth, and his time was the second fastest by a Japanese man in history.

The elite women's race was won by Kenyan Brigid Kosgei in a time of 2:16:02, the third fastest ever time as well as being a competition record. At the half way point, the leading pack contained Kosgei, Gotytom Gebreslase, Ashete Bekere, Angela Tanui and Hiwot Gebrekidan. Kosgei and Gebreslase broke away after , and Gebreslase was later distanced. Towards the end of the race, Gebreslase was overtaken by Ashete Bekere, who finished second; Gebreslase crossed the finishing line in third place.

The men's wheelchair race was won by Swiss athlete Marcel Hug, in a course record time of 1:22:16. Tomoki Suzuki and Hiroki Nishida finished in second and third places respectively. Tsubasa Kina won the women's wheelchair event; her time of 1:40:21 was slightly slower than the course record that she set in 2020.

Around 20,000 people competed in the mass participation event. It was the first Tokyo Marathon mass participation event since 2019, as the 2020 race only featured elite athletes.

Results

Men

Women

Wheelchair men

Wheelchair women

References

2022 in Japanese sport
2022 marathons
2022 in Tokyo
2021
Tokyo Marathon
Tokyo Marathon, 2021